Zaiping Guo is an Australian engineer and academic.  She specializes in nanomaterials for lithium-ion batteries used in electric vehicles and portable equipment. She headed the Institute of Superconducting and Electronic Materials at the University of Wollongong before winning an Australian Research Council grant for a five-year project in the same field at the University of Adelaide, where she is currently a professor.

References

Australian engineers
Australian academics
Academic staff of the University of Wollongong
Academic staff of the University of Adelaide
Year of birth missing (living people)
Living people